Inner Urge is an album by the jazz saxophonist Joe Henderson, released in 1966 via Blue Note Records, his fourth recorded as a leader. It was recorded at the Van Gelder Studio, Englewood Cliffs, New Jersey, on November 30, 1964. Featuring Henderson along with pianist McCoy Tyner and drummer Elvin Jones (both members of the John Coltrane quartet at this time), and bassist Bob Cranshaw (a member of Sonny Rollins' band).

The compositions
Jazz critic Nat Hentoff interviewed Henderson for the album's original liner notes essay, and Henderson described the creative impulses behind several of the songs to Hentoff. The title track, "Inner Urge," which has since become a jazz standard, was a reflection of a time in his life when Henderson was "coping with the anger and frustration that can come of trying to find your way in the maze of New York, and of trying to adjust the pace you have to set in hacking your way in that city in order to just exist." Henderson also told Hentoff that "Isotope" is a tribute to Thelonious Monk and Monk's use of musical humor. Hentoff writes elsewhere in the liner notes that "El Barrio" represents Henderson's attachment to the "Spanish musical ethos", and that the piece was inspired by Henderson reflecting on his childhood in Lima, Ohio. Henderson is quoted as saying that he gave the other musicians "two simple chords, B minor and C major 7 (B phrygian)", and asked them "to play something with a Spanish feeling" while he improvised a melody for the piece.

Reception
In a review on All About Jazz, Norman Weinstein calls Inner Urge Henderson's, "most emotionally urgent album" and the "ultimate showcase of his distinguished career . . . . The album seems like an apotheosis of hard bop, a ruthlessly probing amplification of a typical, hard-blowing, Blue Note bop session, pushing bop formulas as far as they could be pushed. As such, I consider it not only one of the best dozen Blue Note sessions ever released, I hear it as one of the major statements of jazz in the '60s, actually recreating the political, economic, and social realities of the turbulent times more precisely than most recorded music of the '60s in any style. An absolutely essential listen and a major masterpiece." 

The Penguin Guide to Jazz described the music as "dark and intense".

Track listing
All compositions by Joe Henderson,  except where noted.

"Inner Urge" – 11:58
"Isotope" – 9:15
"El Barrio" – 7:15
"You Know I Care" (Duke Pearson) – 7:22
"Night and Day" (Cole Porter) – 7:24

Personnel

Musicians
Joe Henderson – tenor saxophone
McCoy Tyner – piano
Bob Cranshaw – bass
Elvin Jones – drums

Recording personnel
Alfred Lion – producer
Francis Wolff – cover photograph
Rudy Van Gelder – engineer

Charts

References

1966 albums
Joe Henderson albums
Blue Note Records albums
Albums produced by Alfred Lion
Albums recorded at Van Gelder Studio
Hard bop albums